Michael Kiely (born 2001) is an Irish hurler who plays for Waterford SHC club Abbeyside and at inter-county level with the Waterford senior hurling team. He usually lines out as a forward.

Career

Kiely played at juvenile and underage levels with Abbeyside before progressing onto the club's senior team. He was a member of the University of Limerick team that won the 2022 Fitzgibbon Cup. Kiely first appeared on the inter-county scene as a member of the Waterford minor hurling team before later lining out with the under-20 team. He was drafted onto the Waterford senior hurling team in 2021.

Career statistics

Honours

University of Limerick
Fitzgibbon Cup: 2022, 2023

References

2001 births
Living people
Abbeyside hurlers
Waterford inter-county hurlers